The Tamil Nadu State Film Award for Best Storywriter is given by the state government as part of its annual Tamil Nadu State Film Awards for Tamil  (Kollywood) films.

List of winners
Key

References

Actor